Divan (also Romanized as Dīvān; also known as Bandar-e Dīvān, Bandar-e Rīvān, Duwwān, and Ruvvān) is a village in the Moghuyeh Rural District, in the Central District of Bandar Lengeh County, Hormozgan Province, Iran. At the 2006 census, its population was 1,931, in 310 families.

References 

Populated places in Bandar Lengeh County